The Swinging Barmaids is a 1975 American exploitation film about a serial killer who targets cocktail waitresses. The film was directed by Gus Trikonis, and stars Bruce Watson, Laura Hippe, William Smith, and Dyanne Thorne.

Plot
After murdering a cocktail waitress at the Swing-A-Ling Club, a psychotic killer disguises himself and gains employment at the same club where he continues his killing spree. Three of the club's barmaids and a police lieutenant attempt to stop him.

Cast
Bruce Watson as Tom
Laura Hippe as Jenny
Katie Saylor as Susie
Renie Radich as Marie
William Smith as Lt. Harry White
Dyanne Thorne as Boo-Boo
Zitto Kazann as Zitto
Jim Travis as Dave
Ray Galvin as Jack
John Alderman as Andrews
Milt Kogan as Dan
Judith Roberts as Sally

Cult status
Quentin Tarantino screened the film at his festival in 2007. A critic at the screening wrote:
This flick is kind of bizarre. It’s a serial killer flick that’s not really high on the gore or suspense. It’s a sexploitation flick without much titillation. It’s a William Smith movie where he’s kind of unthreatening (until the end when he’s as badass as you want him to be). None of that means it’s a lame movie. Not at all.

See also
 List of American films of 1975

References

External links
 
The Swinging Barmaids at The New York Times
The Swinging Barmaids at Grindhouse Database
The Swinging Barmaid at TCMDB

1975 films
1970s exploitation films
1970s serial killer films
1975 crime drama films
1970s English-language films
American exploitation films
American serial killer films
American crime drama films
Films with screenplays by Charles B. Griffith
Films directed by Gus Trikonis
1970s slasher films
1970s American films